The Albany Stakes is an American Thoroughbred horse race that is held at the Saratoga Race Course and is open to Thoroughbred three-year-old horses of either gender bred in New York state. It is run at a mile and one eighth on the dirt and currently offers a purse of $250,000.

The Albany is the third and final leg of the "Big Apple Triple", a grouping of three races in New York for horses bred in that state. A horse who wins all three of the Big Apple Triple wins the purse total of each race plus a $250,000 bonus. The first leg is the Mike Lee Stakes run at Belmont Park, and the second leg is the New York Derby at Finger Lakes Race Track. The series began in 1999.

Run since 1978, the Albany was held at Belmont Park in 1981, at Aqueduct Race Track in 1980 and from 1982 to 1985.

In 2008, Tin Cup Chalice won the first Big Apple Triple. Tin Cup Chalice came into the Albany Stakes unbeaten in her first six starts. She came out the first-ever winner of the Big Apple Triple, an accomplishment still unmatched through 2017.

Records
Time record: 
  miles – Prospector's Flag, 1:48.73 (1993) (Albany Stakes)
  miles – Lawyer Ron,  1:46.64 (2007) (Saratoga track record at this distance)

Most wins by a jockey
 3 – Jerry D. Bailey (1989, 1993, 2002) 
 3 – Jorge F. Chavez (1990, 1996, 1997)
 3 – Edgar Prado (2000, 2001, 2010)Most wins by a trainer: 3 – Gary J. Sciacca (1990, 1996, 2016)Most wins by an owner:'''
 2 – Assunta Louis Farm (1979, 1985)
 2 – James F. Edwards (1989, 2001)

Past winners

External links
 The Albany Stakes at Pedigree Query

References

Horse races in New York (state)
Saratoga Race Course
Flat horse races for three-year-olds
Recurring sporting events established in 1978
Racing series for horses
1978 establishments in New York (state)